Earl of Sutherland is a title in the Peerage of Scotland. It was created circa 1230 for William de Moravia and is the premier earldom in the Peerage of Scotland. The earl or countess of Sutherland is also the chief of Clan Sutherland.

The original line of earls of Sutherland had the surname "de Moravia" although they sometimes used the surname "Sutherland", taken from their hereditary title. The name de Moravia meant "of Moray" or "of Murray". The de Moravias who were earls of Sutherland and chiefs of Clan Sutherland, arguably shared their early paternal ancestry with the chiefs of Clan Murray through their shared progenitor Freskin de Moravia. Various branches of the Murray Clan claim descent from Freskin, including those who were earls and later dukes of Atholl. Current research is underway via male-line Y-DNA studies in collaboration with both branches of these clans to determine if any modern branches share an early medieval ancestor. From Robert, 6th Earl (d. 1444) onward the surname Sutherland was used.

Elizabeth Sutherland, 10th Countess of Sutherland, married Adam Gordon, a younger son of George Gordon, 2nd Earl of Huntly, chief of Clan Gordon. Their first son is Alexander Gordon, Master of Sutherland, whose descendants were several of the next earls of Sutherland, who all used the surname Gordon. The title was again held by a long string of men, until the death of William Gordon, 18th earl, without sons, when the title passed to his daughter Elizabeth.

Elizabeth, 19th countess of Sutherland, then married George Granville Leveson-Gower in 1785; he inherited the title of Marquess of Stafford from his father in 1803. The marquess held vast lands and wealth, having inherited from his father, the first marquess of Stafford, from his maternal uncle, the second duke of Bridgewater, and also holding much property associated with the Earldom of Sutherland, which belonged to his wife. He was made Duke of Sutherland in 1833.

The duke's son, also named George, inherited the Earldom of Sutherland from his mother and the Dukedom of Sutherland from his father. The two titles continued united until the death of the fifth duke in 1963. The earldom passed to his niece Elizabeth, while the dukedom had to pass to a male heir.

The subsidiary title associated with the earldom is Lord Strathnaver (created 1230), which is used as a courtesy title by the earl's or countess's eldest son and heir.

The family seat is Dunrobin Castle, near Golspie, Sutherland in Scotland.

Ancestors of the earls of Sutherland

Different sources give different accounts of the ancestors of the earls of Sutherland. The generally accepted ancestry is that William de Moravia (William Sutherland), 1st Earl of Sutherland in the peerage of Scotland (died 1248) was the son of Hugh de Moravia, who in turn was a grandson of Freskin, a Flemish knight. William Fraser, writing in the 19th century gives a similar account but states that Hugh was actually the son of Freskin, rather than his grandson. Sir Robert Gordon (1580–1656), the 17th century historian of the House of Sutherland, and a younger son of Alexander Gordon, 12th Earl of Sutherland, stated that William de Moravia (William Sutherland), 1st Earl of Sutherland (died 1248) was the son of Hugh, Earl of Sutherland who was nicknamed Hugh Freskin, who was in turn son of Robert Sutherland (Earl of Sutherland and founder of Dunrobin Castle), who was son of Walter Southerland (Earl of Sutherland), who was son of Alane Southerland, Thane of Sutherland.

Earls of Sutherland

Although the original line of earls had the surname "de Moravia" in the direct male line, historian Sir Robert Gordon, 1st Baronet, who was a younger son of Alexander Gordon, 12th Earl of Sutherland, states in his book A Genealogical History of the Earldom of Sutherland that the original line in fact used the surname "Sutherland". According to modern historians of the Cambridge University Press, from Robert, 6th Earl onward they used the surname Sutherland.
William de Moravia, 1st Earl of Sutherland (William Sutherland) (c. 1210–1248)
William de Moravia, 2nd Earl of Sutherland (William Sutherland) (c. 1235–1307)
William de Moravia, 3rd Earl of Sutherland (William Sutherland) (died 1330)
Kenneth de Moravia, 4th Earl of Sutherland (Kenneth Sutherland) (c. 1270–1333)
William de Moravia, 5th Earl of Sutherland (William Sutherland) (c. 1312–1370)
Robert Sutherland, 6th Earl of Sutherland (c. 1350–1444)
John Sutherland, 7th Earl of Sutherland (c. 1390–1460)
John Sutherland, 8th Earl of Sutherland (1435–1508)
John Sutherland, 9th Earl of Sutherland (died 1514)
Elizabeth Sutherland, 10th Countess of Sutherland (1470–1535) (younger sister of the 9th Earl, she married Adam Gordon, younger son of George Gordon, 2nd Earl of Huntly)
Alexander Gordon, Master of Sutherland (son of Elizabeth) (c.1505–1530)
John Gordon, 11th Earl of Sutherland (c. 1526–1567)
Alexander Gordon, 12th Earl of Sutherland (c. 1552–1594)
John Gordon, 13th Earl of Sutherland (1576–1615)
John Gordon, 14th Earl of Sutherland (1609–1679)
George Gordon, 15th Earl of Sutherland (1633–1703)
John Gordon, 16th Earl of Sutherland (1661–1733) (changed his surname from Gordon to Sutherland)
William Sutherland, 17th Earl of Sutherland (1708–1750)
William Sutherland, 18th Earl of Sutherland (1735–1766)
Elizabeth Leveson-Gower, 19th Countess of Sutherland (1765–1839)
George Granville Sutherland-Leveson-Gower, 2nd Duke of Sutherland, 20th Earl of Sutherland (1786–1861)
George Granville William Sutherland-Leveson-Gower, 3rd Duke of Sutherland, 21st Earl of Sutherland (1828–1892)
Cromartie Sutherland-Leveson-Gower, 4th Duke of Sutherland, 22nd Earl of Sutherland (1851–1913)
George Granville Sutherland-Leveson-Gower, 5th Duke of Sutherland, 23rd Earl of Sutherland (1888–1963)
Elizabeth Sutherland, 24th Countess of Sutherland (1921–2019)
Alistair Sutherland, 25th Earl of Sutherland (born 1947)

Present peer
Alistair Charles St Clair Sutherland, 25th Earl of Sutherland (born 7 January 1947) is the son of Charles Noel Janson and Elizabeth, Countess of Sutherland. At birth, he was given the names Alistair Charles St. Clair Janson and was formally styled as Master of Sutherland; in 1963 he became Lord Strathnaver, when he also changed his surname to Sutherland. He was educated at Eton College and Christ Church, Oxford, graduating BA.

He worked for the Metropolitan Police between 1969 and 1974 and for IBM between 1976 and 1979.

On 9 December 2019, he succeeded as Earl of Sutherland in the peerage of Scotland (created 1235).

On 29 November 1968, as Strathnaver, he married firstly Eileen Elizabeth Baker, daughter of Richard Wheeler Baker; they were divorced in 1980, having had two daughters:
Lady Rachel Elizabeth Sutherland1 (born 1970)
Lady Rosemary Millicent Sutherland (born 1972)

On 21 March 1980, Sutherland married secondly Gillian Murray, daughter of Robert Murray, and they had a son and a daughter:
Alexander Charles Robert Sutherland, Lord Strathnaver (1981–2022)
Lady Elizabeth Sutherland (born 1984)

Sutherland's heir apparent, Alexander, Lord Strathnaver, died in a fall at cliffs near Thurso Castle on 3 September 2022. The present heir presumptive is Sutherland's eldest daughter, Lady Rachel Sutherland, Mistress of Sutherland.

Line of succession

 Elizabeth Sutherland, 24th Countess of Sutherland (1921–2019)
 Alistair Charles St. Clair Sutherland, 25th Earl of Sutherland (born 1947)
(1). Rachel Elizabeth Sutherland, Mistress of Sutherland (born 1970)
(2). Rosemary Millicent Sutherland (born 1972)
(3). Elizabeth Sutherland Costin (born 1984)
(4). Isaac Sutherland Costin (born 2015)
(5). The Hon. Martin Dearman Sutherland Janson (born 1947)
(6). Nicholas George Sutherland Janson (born 1977)
(7). Benjamin Edward Sutherland Janson (born 1979)
(8). Wilfred Bertie Sutherland Janson (born 2011)
(9). Poppy Islay Sutherland Janson (born 2008)
(10). Isabella Rose Sutherland Janson (born 2013)
(11). Alexander Martin Sutherland Janson (born 1981)
(12). Christopher David Sutherland Janson (born 1984)
(13). Lady Annabell Elizabeth Hélène Bainton (born 1952)
(14). Alice Elizabeth Vernon Prescott (born 1985)

See also
Clan Sutherland
Lord Duffus
Duke of Sutherland
Leveson-Gower family

References

External links
Family tree of the Earls of Sutherland

Earldoms in the Peerage of Scotland

Lists of Scottish people
Lists of Scottish clan chiefs

Noble titles created in 1230